Tixall is a civil parish in the Borough of Stafford, Staffordshire, England. It contains 15 listed buildings that are recorded in the National Heritage List for England. Of these, one is listed at Grade I, the highest of the three grades, and the others are at Grade II, the lowest grade.  The parish includes the village of Tixall and the surrounding area.  The listed buildings include a gatehouse and stabling associated with a country house that has been demolished, a building moved from Ingestre, a farmhouse and farm buildings, an obelisk, two bridges, a lodge, a house, a church, two memorial benches, and a telephone kiosk.


Key

Buildings

References

Citations

Sources

Lists of listed buildings in Staffordshire